Gymnosiphon suaveolens is a flowering plant that can be found from Mexico to Ecuador and Venezuela. It mostly grows in tropical rainforests and lives parasitically on fungus to survive. It can remain underground for many years, emerging only when the conditions are right to flower and fruit.

References

Burmanniaceae